Ambrosia Malone (born 8 January 1998) is an Australian field hockey player.

Personal life
Malone was born in Southport, Gold Coast, Queensland, and made her senior international hockey debut in a test series against Spain in January 2018.

Eight years earlier Malone represented Australia in football when she was selected in the Football Australia U13 Women's team which competed in the AFC Festival of Football in Vietnam. A natural left-footer, she was the only U12 player selected in the group and held down the left defender position. She was named in the Football Australia All Stars (national) squad each subsequent year and in 2012, at U14, was the youngest player named in the FAU17 Junior World Cup Squad.

Malone graduated from Trinity Lutheran College in 2015. At school Malone was highly regarded for her ambitious attitude and natural ability towards all sports. She achieved School Sport Australia national team selection in both hockey (2013, 2014) and football (soccer) (2015). She also represented Queensland School Sport at the 2010 School Sport Australia Cross Country Nationals (14th place), and competed at numerous Queensland School Sport track and field state championships in sprints, long-distance and hurdles events.

In 2013 (aged U15) she was offered a place at the Queensland Academy of Sport (QAS) football program, however in accepting she was required to give up all other sporting activities including her school sport. She declined this offer, preferring to play a range of sports (including football) for both her school and association teams, right up until selected for the Hockeyroos. She still enjoys playing football with friends whenever possible. 
Malone's Year 12 school results (including achieving dux of Physical Education) combined with her outstanding sports record saw her offered direct entry into Griffith University as well as a full scholarship to cover the cost of her studies. She graduated from Griffith University in 2019 with a BA Sport Development.

Career

Junior national team
Malone was part of the Australian women's junior national team 'The Jillaroos' that won bronze at the 2016 Hockey Junior World Cup in Chile.

Senior national team
In May 2018, Malone was officially raised into the Australian national squad. She scored her first international goal in May 2018, at the 2018 Women's Tri-Nations Hockey Tournament in New Zealand, in a match against Japan.

Malone qualified for the Tokyo 2020 Olympics. She was part of the Hockeyroos Olympics squad. The Hockeyroos lost 1-0 to India in the quarterfinals and therefore were not in medal contention.

During 2022 Commonwealth Games semifinal match penalty shootout against India,despite failing to score goal she was given a second chance, due to error of the refrees,which she accepted and scored the goal. She was later criticised for not showing sportsman spirit.

International goals

Recognition
After debuting for Australia in 2018, Malone was nominated for the Women's FIH Rising Star of the Year Award.

References

External links
 
 
 
 
 
 
 Things are rosy for Malone
 Hockey over W-League pays off as Hockeyroos name Malone for World Cup

1998 births
Living people
Australian female field hockey players
Female field hockey forwards
Field hockey players at the 2020 Summer Olympics
Olympic field hockey players of Australia
20th-century Australian women
21st-century Australian women
Sportspeople from the Gold Coast, Queensland
Sportswomen from Queensland
Commonwealth Games silver medallists for Australia
Commonwealth Games medallists in field hockey
Field hockey players at the 2022 Commonwealth Games
Medallists at the 2022 Commonwealth Games